Fussy is a commune in the Cher department of France.

Fussy may also refer to:
 "Fussy" (song), 2008 single  by End of Fashion
 Mr. Fussy, a Mr. Men character
 Hortensia Fussy (born 1954), Austrian sculptor